Thomas P. Vitale is Executive Vice President of Programming & Original Movies for Syfy and Chiller, and is responsible for the acquisition and scheduling of all programming, as well as the development and commissioning of original movies and specials, for both networks.

Biography
He started working for the network in March 1993.

Vitale has worked for television since 1987 with stints at Viacom, in program syndication, and NBC. In 1999, Vitale co-produced an Off-Off-Broadway play, Dyslexic Heart. A graduate of Williams College, Vitale sat on the board of the Williams Club for nearly 10 years, and remains active in Williams alumni activity.  He also served as President of Fieri Manhattan, and was the NYS Vice President of Fieri National, an Italian-American service, cultural and charitable organization.

References

External links
 

Year of birth missing (living people)
Living people
Syfy
Williams College alumni